Goodnight Sweetheart is a British science fiction time travel sitcom, starring Nicholas Lyndhurst, created by Laurence Marks and Maurice Gran, and produced by the BBC. The sitcom is about the life of Gary Sparrow, an accidental time traveller who leads a double life through the use of a time portal, which allows him to travel between the London of the 1990s and the London of the 1940s during the Second World War. The sitcom's creators, who also created Birds of a Feather and The New Statesman, wrote most of the plots for the episodes.

The sitcom premiered on BBC 1 on 18 November 1993 and ran for six series until its conclusion on 28 June 1999, with repeats after this date being aired on ITV3, Gold, Drama, Yesterday and Forces TV on Sky Digital. Lyndhurst's involvement in the sitcom allowed him to win the Most Popular Comedy Performer at the National Television Awards in 1998 and 1999. On 2 September 2016, the sitcom received a one-off special entitled Many Happy Returns, following events after the final episode. The sitcom itself later received a musical adaptation in 2017, while plans for a sequel by Marks and Gran remain active as of 2022.

Premise 

Goodnight Sweetheart is about the life of Gary Sparrow (Nicholas Lyndhurst). In 1993, Gary works as a TV repairman, who struggles with his life and the marriage to his ambitious wife Yvonne, while being best friends with Ron Wheatcroft, a printer whose marriage is on the brink of collapse. On attending a TV repair call-out in London's East End, Gary accidentally discovers a time portal at Duckett's Passage, which leads to war time London. The incident leads him to encountering Phoebe Bamford, a pretty barmaid who works in the "Royal Oak" pub, her father Eric who runs the pub and Reg Deadman, a dim-witted but friendly policeman. The meeting with Phoebe leads Gary to strike up a relationship with her and on finding he can use the time portal to travel between this time and the present, uses it to continue seeing Phoebe. To ensure his visits do not interfere with history, Gary brings in assistance from Ron as a confidant, to aid him with problems and to supply him with 1940s five-pound notes and identity documents.

Gary soon finds himself leading a double life as a result of using the time portal. When visiting Phoebe, he explains his absences through working as a secret agent, using his knowledge of future wartime events to his advantage in the deception, while also claiming to be a singer-songwriter, passing off modern pop songs as his own and supplying many items from the present that were rationed in wartime Britain. When with Yvonne, Gary initially claims his absences to be major call-outs for his work but after quitting his job in 1995 to buy and run a shop called "Blitz 'n' Pieces" – selling goods he acquires in the 1940s as rare memorabilia, to maintain access to the time portal in the present – he uses it to lie that he has to be absent to conduct buying trips for stock.

Over the next five years, life for Gary is further complicated by his relationship to the two women. Phoebe eventually takes over the running of the Royal Oak after the death of her father Eric, later marrying Gary, despite him committing bigamy. The pair's marriage results in them having a son, Michael, before moving into a luxury flat in Mayfair, with Reg becoming a doorman in their building after retiring from the police. Although Yvonne becomes pregnant, only to suffer a miscarriage in the process, she later manages to become a success with her organic beauty products, opening a company and transforming into a millionaire, allowing her and Gary to own a luxury apartment. Ron later faces a divorce, losing both his home and control of his printing company, adding to Gary's problems, who eventually allows him to have the lease for his Mayfair flat in the present. During his time in the past, Gary has encounters with several historical figures, including Winston Churchill, George Formby and Noël Coward, while also dealing with some of the peculiar effects of time travel during various trips.

Goodnight Sweetheart eventually concludes in 1945 during VE Day. In 1999, Yvonne becomes suspicious of Gary's frequent absences and follows him to the shop, where she witnesses his disappearance through the time portal. Gary later becomes trapped in the past when the portal closes after he saves Clement Attlee from an assassination attempt by poisoning. He later deduces that it was his destiny to travel back in time with the purpose of saving Attlee's life and the portal closed because he had fulfilled this purpose. Gary is resigned to the fact that he is forced to stay with Phoebe and their son, though he writes a message behind a strip of wallpaper of his Mayfair flat, knowing that Ron is redecorating it in 1999. Gary’s writing appears before Ron and Yvonne in real time advising him to tell Yvonne everything. He does so off camera and Yvonne advises him that she no longer wishes to have any contact with him, which he accepts. The final episode of the original series cuts to Yvonne standing at the gates of Blitz 'n' Pieces, wondering whether or not they would meet again, before being joined by Ron. In 1945, Gary is standing in Duckett’s Passage, wondering the same, before being joined by Phoebe and Michael.

Many Happy Returns 
In the one-off 2016 special, Gary is still married to Phoebe as they live through the 1960s with their son Michael, who is now a teenager. Gary, missing the modern world, decides to visit the hospital where his younger self is being born but inadvertently encounters his father who faints, leaving him to hold his younger self. The incident causes Gary to be thrown into the future in the 2010s, arriving in the men's toilets of a trendy burger joint in east London, where his former shop was. During his visit, Gary meets Yvonne, now a multimillionaire investor, with Ron as her tenant in the basement. To his shock, Gary learns that Yvonne got pregnant before the closure of the time portal in 1999 and that he now has a 16-year-old daughter named Ellie. After meeting her, Gary contemplates living a double life again, upon finding a new time portal has opened, hoping to get to know his daughter, whilst still maintaining his life in the 1960s.

Episodes 

A total of 59 episodes were made, including a Christmas special in 1995 and a special in 2016. Marks and Gran, the creators, wrote the first series; many later episodes were written by other writers. As in Marks and Gran's sitcom Get Back, most episodes of Goodnight Sweetheart — and the programme — were named after popular song titles, others being derived from film titles. The show is named after the song "Goodnight, Sweetheart", a popular song of the 1930s and 1940s, popularised by Al Bowlly in 1931; it was later sung by Nick Curtis as the series signature tune. During one episode Gary and Phoebe refer to Bowlly's death during the Second World War. Because of a script-editing error, two episodes (series one, episode six and series four, episode two) were both titled "In the Mood". There is no special connection between these two episodes.

Cast

DVD releases 
All six series and the 1995 Christmas Special have been released on DVD in the UK (Region 2) with edits made to certain episodes, the Christmas special was released on the third series DVD. The first five series have been released in Australia (Region 4).

 Note although the 2016 special "Many Happy Returns" has not been released onto DVD it was released digitally September 2016 on BBC Store.

Future 
The show's writers and producers have stated they have received thousands of emails and letters regarding the show wishing for its return to the small screen. Laurence Marks and Maurice Gran have both stated that while there are no plans to bring the series back, it might possibly come back if the musical is made and is a success. On 5 July 2016 it was announced that the show would be returning to BBC One for a one-off special, as part of the BBC's "landmark sitcom season". Unlike the original series, which was filmed in London, it was filmed and produced at dock10 studios, in Salford Quays. Marks and Gran wrote the script and Lyndhurst returned to the role of Gary Sparrow. The special episode aired on 2 September 2016 on BBC One. It received overwhelming praise by fans of the show and was trending on Twitter for eight hours after it been broadcast. Marks and Gran announced on Twitter on 6 October that the BBC had passed on making a new series.

Musical
Since 2014 there has been talk of Goodnight Sweetheart being turned into a musical and in December 2017, dates for the long anticipated stage musical were announced. This jukebox style musical would feature well-known songs from the 1940s and 1980s with the world premiere taking place at the Brookside Theatre, Romford in September 2018.

References

External links 

 
 Goodnight Sweetheart at the British Film Institute
 
 
 
 Goodnight Sweetheart at British TV Comedy Guide

1993 British television series debuts
1999 British television series endings
1990s British comedy-drama television series
1990s British comic science fiction television series
1990s British romantic comedy television series
1990s British sitcoms
2010s British comedy-drama television series
2010s British comic science fiction television series
2010s British romantic comedy television series
2010s British sitcoms
Adultery in television
BBC comedy-drama television shows
BBC romance television shows
BBC science fiction television shows
BBC television sitcoms
British romantic drama television series
British time travel television series
English-language television shows
Television series about marriage
Television series by Fremantle (company)
Television series set in the 1940s
Television shows set in London
Television shows shot at Teddington Studios
World War II television comedy series